Parsons Harbour or New Harbour is located east of Cape La Hune on Hermitage Bay. The Post Office was established in 1951 on May 25. The first Postmaster was Freeman Foss.

See also
 List of communities in Newfoundland and Labrador

Ghost towns in Newfoundland and Labrador